Urai is a rural locality (a village) in Asovskoye Rural Settlement, Beryozovsky District, Perm Krai, Russia. The population was 35 as of 2010. There is 1 street.

Geography 
Urai is located on the Asovka River, 28 km southeast of  Beryozovka (the district's administrative centre) by road. Asovo is the nearest rural locality.

References 

Rural localities in Beryozovsky District, Perm Krai